The Turkish Ambassador to France is the official representative of the President of Turkey and the Government of Turkey to the President of France and Government of France.

List of Turkish chiefs of mission to France 
1925–1930 – Fethi Okyar
1930–1932 – Münir Ertegün
1939–1943 – Behiç Erkin
1944–1956 – Numan Menemencioğlu
1956–1957 – Zeki Kuneralp
1957–1960 – Feridun Cemal Erkin
1962–1965 – Bülent Uşaklıgil
1965–1966 – Namık Kemal Yolga 
Dec 19, 1966 – May 22, 1968 – Nureddin Vergin
1968–1972 – Hasan Esat Işık
Nov 2, 1974 – Oct 24, 1975 – İsmail Erez
1976–1978 – Orhan Eralp
1988–1991 – İlter Türkmen
1991–1998 – Tanşuğ Bleda 
1998–2002 – Sönmez Köksal
2002–2005 – Uluç Özülker
2005–2009 – Osman Korutürk
2010–2014 – Tahsin Burcuoğlu
Ambassadors of Turkey to France
Turkey
France